Fashions on Parade is an American fashion-themed television series that aired on the now-defunct DuMont Television Network Fridays at 8pm EST from November 4, 1948, to April 24, 1949, then broadcast on ABC from April 27 to June 29, 1949. The show was hosted by Adelaide Hawley Cumming beginning on local DuMont stations on February 5, 1948.

Overview
The show featured models showcasing the then-latest fashions, and was the first national television program sponsored by Procter & Gamble. Each episode was 30 minutes long, and was also broadcast under the titles Television Fashions and Fashion Parade.

Episode status
Two episodes of the program (June 8, 1949, and a second 1949 episode) are held in the J. Fred MacDonald collection at the Library of Congress.

See also
List of programs broadcast by the DuMont Television Network
List of surviving DuMont Television Network broadcasts
1948-49 United States network television schedule
And Everything Nice

Bibliography
David Weinstein, The Forgotten Network: DuMont and the Birth of American Television (Philadelphia: Temple University Press, 2004) 
Alex McNeil, Total Television, Fourth edition (New York: Penguin Books, 1980) 
Tim Brooks and Earle Marsh, The Complete Directory to Prime Time Network TV Shows, Third edition (New York: Ballantine Books, 1964)

External links
 
 DuMont historical website

DuMont Television Network original programming
1948 American television series debuts
1949 American television series endings
American Broadcasting Company original programming
1940s American documentary television series
Black-and-white American television shows
English-language television shows
Fashion-themed television series